This is a list of the number of incidents labelled as terrorism and not believed to have been carried out by a government or its forces (see state terrorism and state-sponsored terrorism). The following tables show the number of incidents, deaths, injuries based on data from the Global Terrorism Database (GTD) which is collected and collated by the National Consortium for the Study of Terrorism and Responses to Terrorism (START) at the University of Maryland. The GTD defines a terrorist attack as "the threatened or actual use of illegal force and violence by a non‐state actor to attain a political, economic, religious, or social goal through fear, coercion, or intimidation."

Worldwide

By year

By country

2017

2016

2015

2014

2013

2012

See also
 Global Terrorism Index
 State-sponsored terrorism 
 List of countries by Fragile States Index

References

External links
Global Terrorism Index by Institute for Economics and Peace

Terrorism-related lists
Terrorism